The 1880 United States presidential election in Maryland took place on November 2, 1880, as part of the 1880 United States presidential election. Voters chose eight representatives, or electors to the Electoral College, who voted for president and vice president.

Maryland voted for the Democratic nominee, Winfield Scott Hancock, over the Republican nominee, James A. Garfield by a margin of 8.82%.

Results

Results by county

See also
 United States presidential elections in Maryland
 1880 United States presidential election
 1880 United States elections

Notes

References 

Maryland
1880
Presidential